Charles Creighton Stratton (March 6, 1796 – March 30, 1859) was a politician from New Jersey who served in the United States House of Representatives and was later the 15th governor of New Jersey.

Biography
He was born, and died, in Swedesboro, in Gloucester County, New Jersey.  He is interred at Trinity Church Cemetery in Swedesboro.

He graduated from Rutgers College in 1814, and engaged in agricultural pursuits. He was a member of the New Jersey General Assembly in 1821, 1823, and again in 1829. He was elected as a Whig to the Twenty-fifth United States Congress (1837–1839); presented credentials as a Member-elect to the Twenty-sixth Congress, but the House declined to seat him ; reelected to the Twenty-seventh United States Congress (1841–1843).  He chose not to run again in 1842. Stratton served as a member of the 1844 Constitutional convention (political meeting) that created a revised New Jersey State Constitution.

The new 1844 New Jersey State Constitution provided for direct election of a governor for a single three-year term. Stratton ran on the Whig ticket, and campaigned on a platform opposing the powerful railroad interests of the state. The Democratic candidate was Pennsylvania-born John R. Thomson, who was a stockholder in the railroad and a vigorous advocate of internal improvements.

Stratton won, and served as governor from January 21, 1845, to January 17, 1848. After his term he resumed agricultural pursuits. He married Sarah Taggart of Philadelphia in 1854.  Because of ill health, he resided in Europe in 1857 and 1858.

Although he had no children, he had two notable nephews.  Benjamin Franklin Howey was a Republican member of the Forty-eighth United States Congress (1883–1885) from the 4th Congressional District. Another nephew, Thomas Preston Carpenter, served as an Associate Justice on the New Jersey Supreme Court.

His home in Woolwich Township, New Jersey, the Gov. Charles C. Stratton House, was built in 1791 and added to the National Register of Historic Places on January 29, 1973.

References

External links

Biographical information of Charles C. Stratton, New Jersey State Library – document is damaged as of July 6, 2006.
New Jersey Governor Charles Creighton Stratton, National Governors Association

1796 births
1859 deaths
People from Swedesboro, New Jersey
People from Woolwich Township, New Jersey
Politicians from Gloucester County, New Jersey
Governors of New Jersey
Members of the New Jersey General Assembly
Burials in New Jersey
Whig Party members of the United States House of Representatives from New Jersey
19th-century American politicians
Whig Party state governors of the United States
Rutgers University alumni
19th-century American Episcopalians